The Audience is a young post-punkband from Nuremberg, Germany. In 2007, the band released their first album Celluloid on the German label Hazelwood. The band described its musical style as a "polymorphous potpourri of rock, punk, garage and new wave".

Lead singer is Bernd Pflaum. He is supported by an eclectic rock accompaniment with a prominent presence of the organ, played by Johannes Preiss. Other band members are bass player Michael Arnold, guitarist Sebastian Wild and drummer Florian Helleken.

During the Eurokeennes Festival of 2007, The Audience won the Tremplin band contest. In a review on the 3VOOR12 website, the band was praised as the "greatest revelation" of festival De Affaire as well as "absolutely promising".

References

External links
The Audience official website
The Audience on the Hazelwoodrecord label site
Myspace page of The Audience (German)

German indie rock groups